A. fenestrata may refer to:

 Alveopora fenestrata, a coral species in the genus Alveopora found in the Houtman Abrolhos 
 Amphisbaena fenestrata, a worm lizard species
 Anastrepha fenestrata, a fruit fly species
 Apha fenestrata, Butler, a moth species in the genus Apha and the family Eupterotidae found in India 
 Ausia fenestrata, a curious Ediacaran period tunicate fossil

See also
 Fenestrata (disambiguation)